Cristiana is an Italian and Portuguese given name, from Cristiano. It is also a feminine given name in Romania, being the feminine form of Cristian.

 Cristiana Capotondi
 Cristiana Cucchi
 Cristiana Peres
 Cristiana Oliveira

See also
 Cristina (disambiguation)
 Christiana (disambiguation)

Romanian feminine given names
Italian feminine given names
Portuguese feminine given names